Platax teira, also known as the teira batfish, longfin batfish, longfin spadefish, or round faced batfish is a fish from the Indo-West Pacific. It occasionally makes its way into the aquarium trade.

Description

Platax teira has a dark blotch under the pectoral fin, with another long dark mark above the base of the anal fin. Looked at from the side, it has a roughly circular body with a low hump on the nape. This fish is usually silver, grey or brownish. It has a blackish band through the eye and another band with the pectoral fin. They will change colour from silvery white with no bands, to brown with darker banding as you watch, and then fade back to silver again.

Distribution
In Australia it can be found from the central coast of Western Australia, around the tropical north of the country and south to the southern coast of New South Wales.
In India it was reported from the Gulf of Mannar. It has been reported twice recently in the Mediterranean Sea, off Turkey and Israel.
 They are known to reside among floating seaweed, debris, and artificial reefs.

Habitat
The species occurs in shallow coastal habitats to deeper offshore.

Diet
Platax teira is an omnivore. It will eat plankton, sessile invertebrates, small invertebrates, and marine algae.

In the aquarium
They are a very peaceful and social fish and will form schools with others of their species. They should not be kept with very aggressive species that may harass them as juveniles. Teira batfish are usually rather small when first purchased, but they will rapidly outgrow a small home aquarium to reach a maximum size of 24".

References
 
3. Marimuthu, N., J.J. Wilson and A.K. Kumaraguru, 2005. Teira batfish, Platax teira (Forsskal, 1775) in Pudhumadam coastal waters, drifted due to the tsunami of 26 December 2004. Current Science 89(8):1310-1312.

External links
 

Ephippidae
Fish described in 1775
Taxa named by Peter Forsskål